Brujerizmo is the third studio album by Brujeria. Brujerizmo featured a more groove-oriented style, with a clear and refined sound as opposed to the deathgrind style of the previous albums.

Reception

CMJ (2/12/01, p. 37) - "Machete death metal...more venomous and hotter than a Habanero pepper....Juan Brujo's growling political rants strike out against hate, racism and xenophobia."

Melody Maker (11/28/00, p. 52) - 3.5 stars out of 5 - "Wonderfully demented thrash....this is south-of-the-border murderous noise, absolutely bereft of anything approaching accessibility....here's a record your parents will worry about you owning."

NME (12/9/00, p. 45) - 8 out of 10 - "They take a hyper-violent idea to its logical, bowel-churning and comically thrilling end."

Track listing
All tracks by Brujeria

"Brujerizmo" – 3:50 ("Witchcraft")
"Vayan Sin Miedo" – 2:16 ("Go Without Fear")
"La Traición" – 1:57 ("The Betrayal")
"Pititis, Te Invoco" – 2:24 ("Pititis I Summon You")
"Laboratorio Cristalitos" – 1:31 ("Laboratory Crystals")
"Division del Norte" – 3:51 ("Northern Division")
"Marcha de Odio" – 2:49 ("March of Hate")
"Anti-Castro" – 2:33 ("Anti-Castro")
"Cuiden a los Niños" – 3:30 ("Take Care of the Kids")
"El Bajón" – 1:59 ("The Fall", an expression to refer to when you stop being high, particularly if it is sudden)
"Mecosario" – 2:47 ("Cum-ossuary")
"El Desmadre" – 1:41 ("The Excess")
"Sida de la Mente" – 4:36 ("AIDS of the Mind")

Personnel
 Juan Brujo - vocals
 Asesino - guitars, bass
 Fantasma - bass, vocals
 Güero Sin Fe - bass, vocals
 Greñudo - drums
 Hongo - bass, guitars
 Pinche Peach - vocals
 Pititis - female vocals
 Hongo Jr. - drums
 Cristo de Pisto - guitars
 Marijuano Machete - vocals

References

Brujeria (band) albums
Roadrunner Records albums
2000 albums